White Island is an island in the Ross Archipelago of Antarctica. It was discovered by the Discovery Expedition (1901–04) and so named by them because of the mantle of snow which covers it. Some 142 km2 of shelf ice adjoining the north-west coast of the island has been designated an Antarctic Specially Protected Area (ASPA 137) because it supports an isolated small breeding population of Weddell seals.

White Island consists of two Pleistocene shield volcanoes overlain by volcanic cones. The last known eruption occurred 0.17 million years ago.

See also 
 List of Antarctic and subantarctic islands
 Mount Nipha, standing almost precisely in the center of White Island
 Speden Bench, on the west of White Island

References

External links

 
Pleistocene shield volcanoes
Polygenetic shield volcanoes